Wagstaff may refer to:

Places
 Wagstaff, Kansas, U.S.
 Wagstaff, New South Wales, Australia

Fictional places  

 Wagstaff School, in the American television series Bob's Burgers

Other uses
 Wagstaff prime, in number theory

People with the surname
 Alfred Wagstaff Jr. (1844–1921), New York politician
 Barry Wagstaff (born 1945), English association footballer
 Blanche Shoemaker Wagstaff (1888–1959), American poet
 Harold Wagstaff (1891–1939), English rugby league footballer
 Jesse Wagstaff (born 1986), Australian professional basketball player
 Julian Wagstaff (born 1970), Scottish music composer
 Ken Wagstaff (born 1942), English professional footballer
 Norma Wagstaff (born 1942), birth name of the wife of John Major
 Patty Wagstaff (born 1951), American aerobatic pilot
 Sam Wagstaff (1921–1987), American curator and collector
 Samuel S. Wagstaff Jr. (born 1945), American mathematician
 Scott Wagstaff (born 1990), English professional footballer
 Stuart Wagstaff (1925–2015), Australian television personality
 Tony Wagstaff (born 1944), English professional footballer
 Will Wagstaff (born c. 1960), British ornithologist and naturalist

Fictional characters 

 Captain Wagstaff, in the Australian television series Are You Being Served?
 Prof. Quincy Adams Wagstaff and his son Frank Wagstaff, in Marx Brothers film Horse Feathers
 Calvin "Cheese" Wagstaff, a character in the television series The Wire

Pseudonyms
 Simon Wagstaff, Esq., pseudonym of Anglo-Irish writer Jonathan Swift (1667–1745)

See also
 Wagstaffe, a surname